Dylan Rockoff (born September 8, 1994) is an American singer-songwriter. In 2017 Rockoff opened for Bon Jovi during their This House Is Not for Sale Tour in New York City.

Life and career

Early life and education 
Rockoff was born September 8, 1994 in Williamsport, Pennsylvania and grew up in nearby Loyalsock Township. He attended Loyalsock Township High School where he was an active member in the schools choir, music and drama programs. After graduating high school Rockoff attended Northeastern University in Boston.

Musical career 
In 2017 Rockoff won a Live Nation competition that allowed him to open for Bon Jovi at the Madison Square Garden in New York City.

In 2018, Rockoff was nominated for Boston Artist of the Year by WBUR-FM. In 2019 Rockoff participated in a charity concert in his hometown. Rockoff and several other artists volunteered their time and raised over $35,000 for local pediatric cancer and special needs organizations.

On January 17, 2020, Rockoff released his second studio album Semicolon & Parenthesis. The album saw success it peaked at Number 32 on ITunes Top 100 chart and for a short time number 2 on the iTunes Pop Chart.

Rockoff has performed at venues in Pennsylvania, Massachusetts, New York, New Jersey and Tennessee.

Personal life 
Rockoff lives in Nashville, Tennessee. His parents still reside in the Williamsport area where his father is a urologist.

Discography

Studio albums

Singles

References

External links 
 Dylan Rockoff at Genius
 Dylan Rockoff on YouTube

1994 births
Living people
Singer-songwriters from Pennsylvania
People from Williamsport, Pennsylvania
American electronic musicians